Banff and Buchan was a constituency of the Scottish Parliament (Holyrood) between 1999 and 2011 when it was substantially succeeded by Banffshire and Buchan Coast. It elected one Member of the Scottish Parliament (MSP) by the first past the post method of election. Also, however, it was one of nine constituencies in the North East Scotland electoral region, which elects seven additional members, in addition to nine constituency MSPs, to produce a form of proportional representation for the region as a whole.

Electoral region 

Until the 2011 election, the other eight constituencies of the North East Scotland region were Aberdeen Central, Aberdeen North, Aberdeen South, Angus, Dundee East, Dundee West, Gordon  and West Aberdeenshire and Kincardine

The region covers the Aberdeenshire council area, the Aberdeen City council area, the Dundee City council area, part of the Angus council area, a small part of the Moray council area and a small part of the Perth and Kinross council area.

Constituency boundaries 

The Banff and Buchan constituency was created at the same time as the Scottish Parliament, in 1999, with the name and boundaries of an  existing Westminster constituency. In 2005, however, the boundaries of the Westminster (House of Commons) constituency were subject to some alteration.

Boundary review 

Following the First Periodic review of constituencies for the Scottish Parliament, Banff and Buchan has become the newly drawn seat of Banffshire and Buchan Coast for the elections in 2011.

Council area 

The Holyrood constituency covered a northern portion of the Aberdeenshire council area. The rest of the Aberdeenshire area is covered by two other constituencies, both also in the North East Scotland electoral region: Gordon was the constituency to the south of the Banff and Buchan constituency, and the former West Aberdeenshire and Kincardine was further south. Gordon also covered a small eastern portion of the Moray council area.

Members of the Scottish Parliament

Election results

 

 

 

 
 
 

 

 

 

 

 
 

Politics of Aberdeenshire
Scottish Parliament constituencies and regions 1999–2011
1999 establishments in Scotland
Constituencies established in 1999
2011 disestablishments in Scotland
Constituencies disestablished in 2011
Banff, Aberdeenshire
Fraserburgh
Peterhead
Alex Salmond